Kang Kwi-tae (Hangul: 강귀태, Hanja: 姜貴泰; born August 12, 1979) is a South Korean catcher for the Kia Tigers of the KBO League. He bats and throws right-handed.

Amateur career
Upon graduation from high school, Kang, one of the top catching prospects, was drafted by the Hyundai Unicorns in the 2nd round of the  KBO Draft, but he subsequently opted instead to enter Dongguk University and play college baseball.

As a freshman at Dongguk University, Kang shared the playing time behind the plate but showed signs of promise as an offensive catcher, batting .333 with 3 home runs and 14 RBI. In February , Kang was selected for the South Korean collegiate national baseball team and participated in the 3 Nations Invitational Baseball Tournament held in Taiwan.

He became the first player of Dongguk University to hit for the cycle, doing so on April 8, 2000. In July 2000, Kang was selected for the South Korea collegiate national team and competed in the Korea–USA Baseball Championship Series.

He competed in the Asian Baseball Championship for the South Korean national team, serving a backup catcher to Chae Sang-byung.

Notable international careers

Professional career
In that season, he played 74 games, serving as the back-up catcher to Park Kyung-oan and batting a respectable .272 in 147 at-bats. Prior to the  season, Park Kyung-oan was traded to the SK Wyverns. However, Kang remained in the backup role as veteran catcher Kim Dong-soo signed a free-agent contract with the Unicorns.

In , Kang first appeared in over 100 games as a catcher, batting .264 and posting career-highs in RBI (38) and home runs (8).

External links 
Career statistics and player information from Korea Baseball Organization

Hyundai Unicorns players
Kiwoom Heroes players
Kia Tigers players
KBO League catchers
South Korean baseball players
Dongguk University alumni
1979 births
Living people
Sportspeople from Incheon
South Korean Buddhists